Release is Sister Hazel's seventh studio album. It was released on August 18, 2009 through Croakin' Poets/Rock Ridge.

Unlike previous Sister Hazel albums, all of the band members contributed to the songwriting. According to Ryan Newell, the album got its name because they "Took a different approach on this record and 'released' the past method."

Track listing

"Release" (Ryan Newell, Emerson Hart, Pat McGee) - 3:51
"Take a Bow" (Newell, Mike Daly, McGee) - 3:00
"I Believe in You" (Andrew Copeland, Stan Lynch) - 2:51
"Run for the Hills" (Copeland, Britton Cameron) - 3:41
"Better Way" (Ken Kelly, Lindsey Kelly, Mark Trojanowski) - 3:56
"Walls and Cannonballs" (Ken Block) - 3:14
"Vacation Rain" (Jett Beres) - 3:51
"See Me Beautiful" (Block) - 4:06
"One Life" (Cameron, Copeland, Lynch) - 5:13
"Take It Back" (L. Kelly, K. Kelly, Trojanowski) - 3:49
"Fade" (Newell, Chuck Carrier) - 3:29
"Ghost in the Crowd" (Beres) - 5:07

Personnel
Ken Block - lead vocals, acoustic guitar
Jett Beres - bass, harmony vocals
Andrew Copeland - rhythm guitar, vocals
Ryan Newell - lead and slide guitar, harmony vocals
Mark Trojanowski - drums

References 

2009 albums
Sister Hazel albums